Sporodictyon is a genus of crustose lichens in the family Verrucariaceae. It has 10 species. Most species grow on rocks, although some have been recorded overgrowing soil and mosses.

Taxonomy
The genus was circumscribed in 1852 by Italian lichenologist Abramo Bartolommeo Massalongo, with Sporodictyon schaererianum assigned as the type species. Until fairly recently, the genus was usually included in Polyblastia, which is a conserved name. As a result of molecular phylogenetic work published in 2008, the genus was resurrected by Sanja Savić and Leif Tibell for three species that formed a monophyletic clade, and which included the type species: S. cruentum, S. schaererianum, and S. terrestre. Several molecular phylogenetic-based publications have shown that characters traditionally used to separate taxa in the Verrucariaceae, namely spore septation and growth form, are not always reliable for representing monophyletic groups at generic and higher ranks. Historically, descriptions of Sprodictyon species have relied heavily on the following characters: thallus development, size of perithecia, structure of the involucrellum (the upper, often exposed covering external to the excipulum), and the size and colour of ascospores. However, the morphological variability of species, and sometimes ambiguous generic concepts means that the taxonomy of this group of species has been difficult. Following the molecular work, Savić and Tibell found that ascoma size, spore pigmentation, spore size, and thallus structure are the most useful features for species recognition in Sporodictyon.

Description
Sprodictyon lichens have a grey, greenish grey or brownish crust-like thallus of variable thickness. The perithecia measure 0.4–1.1 mm in diameter, and are hemispherical. The involucrellum is well developed, and is fused to the excipulum in its upper parts. The asci are variably sized (even in the same specimen), with reported dimension ranging from 105 to 236 by 34–118 μm; they typically have eight spores (although sometimes contain fewer). Ascospores are ellipsoidal, to curved with one wider end, to ovoid; they measure 39–84 by 19–47 μm. The colour of mature spores ranges from yellowish to medium brown to dark brown. Spore are muriform, meaning they are divided into smaller internal compartment by transverse and longitudinal septa.

Species
, Species Fungorum (in the Catalogue of Life) accepts 10 species of Sprodictyon.
Sporodictyon arcticum  – Arctic
Sporodictyon cruentum  – Europe; Faeroe Islands; Iceland
Sporodictyon hegetschweileri 
Sporodictyon henschelianum 
Sporodictyon minutum  – Northern Europe
Sporodictyon schaererianum  – Europe; American Arctic
Sporodictyon terrestre  – Europe; Arctic
Sporodictyon theleodes 
Sporodictyon turicense 
Sporodictyon verrucosoareolatum 

These are species that were formerly in Sporodictyon, but are now classified in other genera:
Sporodictyon aurantiacum  = Anthracothecium aurantiacum
Sporodictyon confine  = Pyrenula confinis
Sporodictyon cupulare  = Polyblastia cupularis
Sporodictyon dermatodes  = Polyblastia dermatodes
Sporodictyon globiferum  = Pyrenula globifera
Sporodictyon ochraceoflavum  = Pyrenula ochraceoflava
Sporodictyon rufum  = Staurothele rufa
Sporodictyon rupifragum  = Staurothele rupifraga
Sporodictyon sericeum  = Julella sericea
Sporodictyon variolosum  = Anthracothecium variolosum
Sporodictyon tristiculum  = Agonimia tristicula

Sporodictyon clandestinum  was shown to be part of the largely unresolved Thelidium clade.

References

Verrucariales
Eurotiomycetes genera
Taxa described in 1852
Taxa named by Abramo Bartolommeo Massalongo